Aphyarctia is a monotypic moth genus in the family Erebidae. Its single species, Aphyarctia surinamensis, described by Rothschild in 1911, is found in French Guiana, Suriname, Ecuador, and Bolivia.

References

Phaegopterina
Monotypic moth genera
Moths of South America